Tingena chloradelpha is a species of moth in the family Oecophoridae. It is endemic to New Zealand and can be found in the North and South Islands. The larvae live underground forming silken tubes from which it feeds. It overwinters in these tubes and then pupates enclosed in a weak pale white silken cocoon. The adults of this species is variable in appearance both in the depth of colour as well as in its discal spots which may in some specimens be lacking. The adults are on the wing from October until the end of December and can be found inhabiting domestic gardens as well as cultivated land. They have been seen resting on window frames and can be found inside houses.

Taxonomy
This species was described by Edward Meyrick in 1905 using specimens collected in Wellington by George Hudson and named Borkhausenia chloradelpha. George Hudson discussed and illustrated this species under that name in his 1928 publication The butterflies and moths of New Zealand. In 1988 J. S. Dugdale placed this species within the genus Tingena. The male lectotype is held in the Natural History Museum, London.

Description 
 

Hudson described the larva of this species as follows:

The pupa of this species is enclosed in a weak pale white silken cocoon.

Meyrick described the adults of this species as follows:
This species is similar in appearance to T. griseata and T. innotella but can be distinguished from these two species by its general whitish-ochreous colouring, the submedian brown line on its forewings and hindwings that are a whitish shade. This species is variable in the depth of its colour as well as in the strength of the colour of its discal dots which in some specimens may be lacking.

Distribution

This species is endemic to New Zealand. Other than at its type locality of Wellington, this species has also been observed at Kapiti Island, in New Plymouth, in Christchurch and in Otago.

Life cycle and behaviour 
The larvae of this species overwinters and exists underground in the silken tubes in which it lives and from which it feeds. The adults of the species are on the wing from October until the end of December. Adults can often be observed resting on window frames and have frequently been found inside houses.

Habitat and hosts 
The larvae lives underground making silken tunnels and feeds on the roots of grasses. It frequents domestic gardens and cultivated land.

References

Oecophoridae
Moths of New Zealand
Moths described in 1905
Endemic fauna of New Zealand
Taxa named by Edward Meyrick
Endemic moths of New Zealand